Bakersville may refer to:

Bakersville, Mercer County, New Jersey
Bakersville, North Carolina
Bakersville, Ohio

See also
Bakersfield, California